The University of York has eleven colleges. These colleges provide most of the accommodation for undergraduates and postgraduates at the university. While lectures, examinations, laboratories and facilities such as the central library are run by the university, the colleges play an important role in the pastoral care of the student body.

Every student is a member of a college, staff may choose to join a college if they wish. All the colleges are of equal status, but each has its own constitution. The day-to-day running of the colleges is managed by an elected committee of staff and student members chaired by the college's 'Head of college'. Each college has a Junior Common Room for students, which is managed by the elected Junior Common Room Committee, and a Senior Common Room, which is managed by elected representatives of the college's academic and administrative members. The colleges are deliberately assigned undergraduates, postgraduate students and staff from a wide mixture of disciplines.

History

In 1963 the University of York opened. At the time, the university consisted of three buildings, principally the historic King's Manor in the city centre and Heslington Hall, which has Tudor foundations and is in the village of Heslington on the edge of York. A year later, work began on purpose-built structures on the Heslington West campus, including the construction of the Colleges, which now form the main part of the university.

Baron James of Rusholme, the university's first Vice-Chancellor, set out to create a modern university which retained and updated the collegiate system of the traditional collegiate universities of Oxbridge, It was planned that "Each college will be a unit of 300 students, 150 of whom will be resident, the remainder being in lodgings or in student flats, but using the college as their social centre. This organisation is unlike that of Oxford and Cambridge on one hand or the halls of residence at civic universities on the other. The college will differ from 'Oxbridge' in that they will not be autonomous financially, nor will they be responsible for admission of students or appointment of staff. They will differ from halls of residence in that teaching will be carried on in them." York's first two Colleges, Derwent and Langwith were founded in 1965, and were followed by Alcuin and Vanbrugh in 1967. Goodricke and Wentworth were founded shortly afterwards, in 1968 and 1972 respectively.

After 1972 the construction of Colleges ceased until 1990 with the foundation of James College, York. Initially James was intended to be a postgraduate only college, however the university began to rapidly expand in size almost doubling in size from 4,300 to 8,500 students, in 1993 therefore it was decided that the college should become open to undergraduates. The expansion of student numbers also resulted in the creation of more accommodation by the university which was named 'Halifax Court'; the members of Halifax Court were members of other colleges however soon formed their own Junior Common Room. In 2002 Halifax Court was made a full College of the university and was renamed as Halifax College, York.

In 2003, the university set out plans to create a campus for 5,000 additional students, Heslington East. In May 2008 the City of York planners approved the design for the new campus. It was decided that rather than create a new college that an existing College should be moved. Goodricke College was selected for this and moved onto the new campus in 2009 with James taking over its building on Heslington West. In 2012 the same process took place with Langwith moving to Heslington East and Derwent taking over its previous buildings.

In 2014 Heslington East saw the establishment of the ninth college and was named Constantine after the Roman emperor Constantine the Great, who was proclaimed Augustus in York in 306 AD.

Due to increasing demands for accommodation, two new colleges have been built on the University's East Campus. The first, opened in 2021 is named after Anne Lister and the second is named after David Kato.

Lists of colleges

Organisation and governance
Like other plate glass universities, such as Lancaster, colleges are primarily residence halls as opposed to having the legal status of 'listed bodies' as seen at Oxford and Cambridge.  However, the Colleges do still have considerable autonomy.

Every college is governed by its own constitution. Each college is run by a 'College Council' which is made up of the 'Head of college', a 'Deputy Head of college', the Dean, and representatives of the student membership. Often other non-voting members are included such as senior college Fellows, the senior Porter, and college tutors.

Changes to the structure of the colleges starting in September 2015 means that 'Heads of college' will become part-time and will be assisted by a full-time 'Assistant Head of college'.

Heads of College
The primary official responsible for the running of a college is the 'Head of college'. Colleges use different terms when referring to their Head of college:
 Principal: Constantine College, James College, Langwith College, Vanburgh College
 Provost: Alcuin College, Derwent College, Goodricke College, Halifax College, Wentworth College

College life

Representation
The day-to-day running of the colleges is managed by an elected committee of staff and student members chaired by the college's Provost. Colleges have a Junior Common Room for undergraduate students, which is managed by the elected Junior Common Room Committee, and a Graduate Common Room for post-graduate students, as well as a Senior Common Room, which is managed by elected representatives of the college's academic and administrative members. The only exceptions to this are Wentworth which as a post-graduate only college does not have a Junior Common Room, and Halifax, Constantine and Goodricke which are run by a student association that represents both undergraduates and postgraduates together. Vanbrugh and Langwith's Junior Common Room Committees are branded as College Student Associations, however both Vanbrugh and Langwith retains a Graduate Common Room and a Senior Common Room and therefore it's SA plays the same role as the JCRC in the other colleges.

A University of York Students' Union (YUSU) referendum proposing the formation of College Student Associations passed in 2013. This did not change the structure of student representation in the colleges however, as the colleges are independent of YUSU and therefore any change in the way representation is organised would require a college referendum. No college has changed its status (Halifax having already had a SA, and Constantine only being founded after the referendum), with Wentworth being the only college to have held a referendum on changing to a Student Association which resulted in a no vote.

Junior Common Rooms and Student Associations are headed by an 'Executive Committee' made up of a Chair/President, Vice Chair/Presidents, Secretary, and Treasurer who have signatory powers. Below the executive committee are the rest of the members of the committees who have responsibilities for welfare, activities, events and the general running of the committee.

Social activities
The colleges are responsible for many of the social activities of their members, and each JCRC organises the 'Fresher's Week' activities for its college. Another central role is the appointment of STYCs (an abbreviation for Second and Third Year Contacts) who are returning students who are responsible for looking after new first years.

Intercollegiate sport is one of the main activities of the colleges. Currently there are 21 leagues with weekly fixtures, in addition a number of one day events are organised as well. The results of the leagues and the one-day events are combined to determine the winner of the 'College Cup', in the 2013/14 standings James College won, with Derwent College coming second, and Alcuin College coming third.

In 2014 a new tournament was created "College Varsity" which was held between York's colleges and the colleges of Durham University. York hosted the first tournament which was won by Durham's colleges, as was the second held in Durham. The third tournament was held in 2016 and was hosted and won by York.

See also
Colleges of the University of Cambridge
Colleges of Durham University
Colleges of the University of Oxford

References

 
University of York
Education in York
Residential colleges